The 2010 Dahsyatnya Awards was an awards show for Indonesian musicians. It was the second annual show.  The show was held on February 26, 2010, at the JITEC Mangga Dua Square in Pademangan, North Jakarta. The awards show was hosted by Raffi Ahmad, Luna Maya, Olga Syahputra, Ade Namnung, Laura Basuki, and Marcel Chandrawinata. The awards ceremonies will held theme for "Be Yourself".

D'Masiv led the nominations with four categories, followed by Peterpan, RAN, Vierra with three nominations.

Winners and nominees
Winners are listed first and highlighted on boldface.

SMS

Jury

References

2010 music awards
Dahsyatnya Awards
Indonesian music awards